Köýtendag is a city and the administrative center of Köýtendag District in Lebap Province, Turkmenistan.  On 29 December 1999, by Parliamentary Resolution No. HM-61, the city and district of Çarşangy (sometimes rendered as "Charshangy") were renamed Köýtendag. On 27 July 2016, by Parliamentary Resolution No. 425-V the town of Köýtendag was upgraded in status to "city in a district".

Köýtendag is located at an altitude of 265 meters on the banks of the Amu-Darya River, which forms the border with Jowzjan Province, Afghanistan. The Afghan town of Qarqin is on the opposite side of the river. Köýtendag is near the eastern end of Lebap Province, and indeed all of Turkmenistan. The plains surrounding the river are quite flat. Near the river the land is quite fertile and arable, supporting some farming, but further from the river the land is arid.

Etymology
The name is a compound of Köýten plus the Turkmen word dag ("mountain"). Köýten is in turn a Turkified version of the Persian compound Kuhi tang,  kuhi - "mountain" and tang - "narrow". The name previously applied to the valley as well as the mountains.  According to Atanyyazow, Çarşaňňy is the name of a Turkmen tribe.

Climate
Köýtendag has a hot desert climate (Köppen climate classification BWh), with cool winters and very hot summers. Rainfall is generally light and erratic, and occurs mainly in the winter and autumn months.

Transportation
Köýtendag is on a branch of the Trans-Caspian railway that leads from Samarqand in Uzbekistan, through the far east of Turkmenistan, and then back to Termez in Uzbekistan and finally Dushanbe in Tajikistan. Köýtendag is one of three stations on this line in Turkmenistan, along with Amydarya and Mukry. That rail line is connected to the Turkmen rail network at the Kerki junction.

The P-37 highway connects the city to Kerki to the west and the border with Uzbekistan in the east.

References 

Populated places in Lebap Region